The New Adventures of Chor Lau-heung is a Hong Kong television series adapted from Chu Liuxiang Xinzhuan of Gu Long's Chu Liuxiang novel series. Michael Miu Kiu-wai starred as the titular protagonist, Chor Lau-heung (Cantonese for "Chu Liuxiang"). The series was first broadcast on TVB from 12 November 1984 to 4 January 1985. It was rerun in Hong Kong on TVB Jade from 1 February to 30 March in 2006.

Plot
Chor Lau-heung brings his three girlfriends (Lei Hung-sau, So Yung-yung and Sung Tim-yee) with him to attend Tso Hing-hau's birthday party. On the way, they meet Song Siu-ching, a spoilt and arrogant girl. After arriving at Tso's house, strange things start happening. Tso's daughter, Ming-lai, is in love with Sit Ban, a youth from a rival family. In the Sit family, Sit Yan, Sit Ban's younger sister, is in love with Yip Sing-nam and wants to be with him, but her father forbids her because Yip Sing-nam is an actor. Tso Ming-lai and Sit Yan attempt to fake their deaths in order to resolve the feuds between their families, but Chor Lau-heung discovers the truth and decides to secretly help the lovers be together.

Cast
 Note: Some of the characters' names are in Cantonese romanisation.

 Michael Miu Kiu-wai as Chor Lau-heung
 Barbara Yung Mei-ling as Song Siu-ching/Princess Wing-ching
 Simon Yam Tat-wah as Yuen Chui-wan
 Austin Wai Tin-chi as Chung-yuen Yat-dim-hung
 Chan Wing-chun as Wu Tit-fa
 Chow Sau-lan as Kam Ling-tsi
 Sharon Yeung as Ko Ah-nam
 Mimi Kung Chi-yan as Wah Chan-chan
 Wong Wan-choi as Yip Sing-nam
 Amy Wu as Sit Yan
 Bobby Au-yeung as Sit Ban
 Wong Man-yee as Tso Ming-lai
 Cheung Ying-choi as Yan Hin-tai
 Kwan Hoi-san as Sit Yi-yan
 Leung San as Master Fu-mui
 Lee Heung-kam as Kam Tai-kwan
 Ko Miu-see as Tung Sam-neung
 Benz Hui as Tso Hing-hau
 Kwok Fung as Ying Man-lei
 Chun Wong as Sit Siu-yan
 Lui Ching-hung as So Yung-yung
 Chi Pui-fan as Lei Hung-sau
 Lau Miu-ling as Sung Tim-yee
 Hui Kin-bong as Ting Fung
 Lau Dan as Mo-fa
 Tsui Man-wah as Sui-mo Yam-kei

External links
 

1984 Hong Kong television series debuts
1985 Hong Kong television series endings
TVB dramas
Hong Kong wuxia television series
Works based on Chu Liuxiang (novel series)
Cantonese-language television shows
Television shows based on works by Gu Long